Wandering eye may refer to:

 strabismus, misalignment of the eyes
 looking at other people (see staring)
 "Wandering Eye", 2005 single by Fat Freddy's Drop